Placer Found is the first full-length recording by the American band Early Day Miners, released on Western Vinyl in 2000. It was reissued by Secretly Canadian in 2020.

Critical reception
AllMusic called Placer Found "a fragile album of moody textures and minimalist, slow rock sound explorations." Exclaim! wrote: "Like a two-headed beast that could be called Calexi-Low, these Miners are more interested in open spaces than the depths; no one could mistake this for music made by a big city band." The Indianapolis Star deemed the album "a liquid dream of a record," writing that "the playing, never agitated or grandiose, challenges many definitions of rock guitar."

Paste described the album as "glassy guitar tones, sedate tempos and a mood that took the slowcore template of Codeine and Low and adapted it for the emo generation." Reviewing the reissue, Spin called the album "an essential catalyst for the new directions that Midwestern indie rock would take in the 21st century."

Track listing
"Placer Found" – 2:54
"East Berlin at Night" – 6:47
"Texas Cinema" – 5:11
"In These Hills" – 8:55
"Stanwix" – 7:32
"Longwall" – 5:48
"Desert Cantos" – 12:15

Personnel
Dan Burton: vocals, guitar
Joseph Brumley: guitar
Rory Leitch: drums
Kenny Chiders: bass
Pete Skafish: bass

References

2000 albums
Early Day Miners albums
Secretly Canadian albums